Robert A. Manning (June 30, 1927 – August 24, 2006) was a member of the Ohio House of Representatives.

References

Republican Party members of the Ohio House of Representatives
2006 deaths
1927 births
20th-century American politicians